Sedum adolphi, the coppertone stonecrop, is a species of succulent plant in the family Crassulaceae. It is native to Mexico, where it grows in rocky terrain and on cliff faces. It has also become naturalized in Sicily and the Canary Islands. It is known for its bright orange-copper leaves and white flowers that bloom in the spring.

Description 
This species grows up to 20 cm tall and has small star-shaped white flowers. It is hardy in USDA zone 9 and southward. Sedum adolphi can be propagated from its cuttings, leaves, and seeds.  The leaves are evergreen and can develop red or orange edges if given enough sun. The  sedum nussbaumerianum is a simple plant to grow that prefers direct sun exposure and when temperatures exceed 20 degrees it prefers windy areas. During their rest perioud which takes place from November to March, it doesn't need much water, since this plant is able to survive with humidity reserves, but only for short periods.

General care 
Sedum nussbaumerianum requires very little care and is easy to grow, making it a popular choice for gardeners and succulent enthusiasts. It thrives in full sun, a well-draining soil, and little water. It is best grown outdoors, but can also do well in hanging baskets or rock gardens. To propagate, you can use leaves, cuttings, or seeds.

References

nussbaumerianum